Mehdiabad (also Romanized as Mehdīābād) is a village in Lalehabad Rural District, Lalehabad District, Babol County, Mazandaran Province, Iran. At the 2006 census, its population was 426, in 106 families.

References 

Populated places in Babol County